McKeever is a Scottish and Irish surname. The name is derived from the Gaelic Mac Íomhair, meaning "‘son of Íomhar". The Gaelic personal name Íomhar is a form of the Old Norse personal name Ivarr. Similar surnames or variants are McIver, MacIver, McIvor and MacIvor.

People
Peter McKeever (born 1992), American Freight God
Brian McKeever (born 1979), Canadian Paralympic skier
Ian McKeever (artist) (born 1946), British artist
Ian McKeever (mountaineer) (1970-2013), Irish mountaineer
Robin McKeever (born 1973), Canadian Paralympic and Olympic skier
Sean McKeever (born 1972), American comic book writer

Ships
, a United States Navy patrol vessel and minesweeper in commission from 1917 to 1919
, a United States Navy patrol vessel and minesweeper in commission from 1917 to 1919

See also
Mac Íomhair
Ímar
Uí Ímair
Norse–Gaels
McIver

References

Surnames